Hit-Monkey is a fictional character appearing in American comic books published by Marvel Comics.

Publication history
Created by writer Daniel Way and artist Dalibor Talajić, Hit-Monkey first appeared in Hit-Monkey #1 (April 2010), a digital comic on Marvel Digital Comics Unlimited. The one-shot was released in print format a week later and, starting in the same month, he was featured in a three-issue story arc in Deadpool #19-21. Cover artist Dave Johnson also accidentally confirmed that Hit-Monkey would be featured in his own three issue limited series, a fact later confirmed by Daniel Way at the 2010 Chicago Comic & Entertainment Expo. Hit-Monkey is inspired by Agent 47 from the Hitman franchise.

Fictional character biography
An unnamed assassin blows up a squad of enemy soldiers as part of a failed political coup. Marked for death, after four days of fleeing for his life he passes out in the snow and is rescued by a troop of Japanese macaques. With the exception of one monkey, the troop accepts the assassin into their clan. The man knows that he is still hunted, so he trains daily, using snowmen as training dummies. Quietly, the monkey that distrusts him watches and learns the assassin's skills. The assassin's health fails, and while the troop tries to save him, the lone monkey objects, eventually fighting the rest of the troop with his newfound skills. 

Because of the violence he displays, the monkey is banished from the clan. Now on his own, the monkey sees a group of men on their way to kill the assassin. He tries to run back to warn his tribe, but is too late: the men kill the assassin as well as the rest of the monkeys. Furious at his clan's slaughter, the monkey picks up extra guns from a bag and kills the entire group of men. Determined to avenge his fallen tribe, the monkey now dedicates his life to killing assassins - under the alias of Hit-Monkey.

In Deadpool #19, Spider-Man finds a local shop owner brutally murdered. Having seen Deadpool in New York earlier, Spider-Man suspects he is the killer, and fights and catches him. Deadpool claims he has an alibi, and after examining the crime scene, says that only one assassin could have pulled off the job so flawlessly: Hit-Monkey. Because Hit-Monkey is known for killing other assassins, they realize that Deadpool is likely on Hit-Monkey's hit list. Spider-Man reluctantly teams up with Deadpool to catch him.

After killing some dirty cops, Hit-Monkey follows Spider-Man in order to find and kill Deadpool. Hit-Monkey accidentally shoots Spider-Man in the fight and seemingly feels bad about it, showing that he is not just a ruthless killer, but a killer of known assassins. Trying to capitalize on this moment, Deadpool attempts to kill Hit-Monkey, but fails and is shot several times. Hit-Monkey leaves him for dead, apparently not knowing about Deadpool's healing factor. Deadpool then pretends to be Spider-Man and fakes his death. At "Spider-Man's" funeral, Hit-Monkey comes to pay his respect, thinking he killed him. Deadpool jumps out of the casket to kill Hit-Monkey, but Spider-Man has rendered both fighters' guns unusable so they can't kill each other without blowing themselves up as well. Deadpool doesn't care and pulls the trigger, seemingly killing Hit-Monkey but surviving due to his healing factor. Nevertheless, Spider-Man reveals that Hit-Monkey did survive or, at least, that his body was not found. Hit-Monkey later returns for a short cameo.

As part of the All-New, All-Different Marvel event, Hit-Monkey appears as a member of S.T.A.K.E.'s Howling Commandos.

Hit-Monkey later joins Domino's incarnation of the Mercs for Money.

Hit-Monkey is seen with the Howling Commandos when they help Old Man Logan rescue Jubilee from Dracula.

Powers and abilities
Hit-Monkey is an expert marksman and martial artist with incredible agility and reflexes.

Collected editions

Other versions

Secret Wars
In the Battleworld Killville, Hit-Monkey is one of the assassins sent to kill MODOK and Thor-version Angela.

In other media

Television

Hit-Monkey streams on Hulu and is written and executive produced by Will Speck and Josh Gordon. It was originally conceived as part of a shared universe that would have led up to a special titled The Offenders, before it was decided it would be a stand-alone series. Jordan Blum, co-creator of the animated series M.O.D.O.K., revealed that the series will have a different animation style than his. The series aired on November 17, 2021 with Jason Sudeikis as the voice of Bryce, Hit-Monkey's deceased mentor and Hit-Monkey himself has his vocal effects provided by Fred Tatasciore.

Video games
 A video game based on Hit-Monkey was announced to be in development by High Moon Studios and published by Activision for release in 2013. However, this was revealed to be a red herring meant to foreshadow the release of the video game Deadpool.
 Hit-Monkey appears as an unlockable playable character in Lego Marvel Super Heroes 2, with his dialogue translated by Gwenpool.
 Hit-Monkey appears as a playable character in Marvel Contest of Champions.

References

External links
 
 
 Hit-Monkey at ComicVine

Reviews

 Review: Hit-Monkey #1, Comic Book Resources
 Hit-Monkey #1 Review, IGN
 Hit-Monkey #1 Review, Comics Bulletin
 Best Shots Reviews: BATMAN & ROBIN #8, HIT MONKEY #1, more, Newsarama

2010 comics debuts
Animal superheroes
Comics characters introduced in 2010
Fictional assassins in comics
Fictional contract killers
Fictional gunfighters in comics
Fictional marksmen and snipers
Fictional monkeys
Marvel Comics animals
Marvel Comics martial artists
Marvel Comics television characters
Marvel Comics titles
One-shot comic titles
Superhero comics
Marvel Comics male superheroes